Club Tacuary is a Paraguayan First Division football team, based in the neighborhood of Jara in Asunción. The club was founded in 1923. 

Tacuary qualified for the Copa Libertadores tournament twice (in 2005 and 2007) and the Copa Sudamericana three times (in 2007, 2012 and 2023). In 2013 it returned to the Paraguayan Segunda División.

In the 2021 season of Paraguay's División Intermedia, Tacuary finished in 3rd and was promoted to the Primera División. 

Over the years Tacuary's youth academy has produced players such as Ramón Cardozo, Hernán Pérez, Luis Páez, Ronald Huth and Brian Montenegro, as well as other young players that have been sold to important club in  the European and Mexican leagues.

Stadium 
The club has traditionally played at the 3,000 capacity Toribio Vargas which is based in Jara neighbourhood. Between 2002 and 2014 however, the club played at the 7,000 capacity Roberto Bettega in the Zeballos Cué neighbourhood. In 2014 the club sold the stadium to a port company for 10 million dollars, and it was subsequently demolished. The club is now back playing in its traditional home.

Honours
Paraguayan Second Division: 1
2002

Paraguayan Third Division: 4
1953, 1961, 1983, 1999

Performance in CONMEBOL competitions
Copa Libertadores: 2 appearances
2005: Preliminary Round
2007: Preliminary Round

Copa Sudamericana: 3 appearances
2007: First Round
2012: First Round
2023: TBD

Current squad

Current squad
As of 6 March, 2022.

Notable players
To appear in this section a player must have either:
 Played at least 125 games for the club.
 Set a club record or won an individual award while at the club.
 Been part of a national team at any time.
 Played in the first division of any other football association (outside of Paraguay).
 Played in a continental and/or intercontinental competition.

1990's
 Ronald Huth (1999–2007, 2009–2011, 2012)
2000's'
  Osvaldo Mendoza (2002)
 Brian Montenegro (2004–2011, 2012)
 Hernán Pérez (2005–2008)
 Ramón Cardozo (2006–2012)
 Luis Fernando Páez (–2006, 2009–)
 Fabian Caballero (2006, 2012)
 José Ariel Núñez (2008–2009)
Non-CONMEBOL players
 Enrique Maximiliano Meza (2004–2005)
 Riki Kitawaki (2005–2012)

Managers
 Oscar Paulin
 Carlos Kiese (1 January 2010–31 December 2010)
 Carlos Manta (1 January 2011–1 July 2011)
 Francisco Ocampo (footballer) (1 January 2011–10 April 2012)
 Luis Cubilla (10 April 2012 – 16 May 2012)
 Gonzalo Ocampo (18 May 2012–)

References

External links

 
Football clubs in Paraguay
Football clubs in Asunción
Association football clubs established in 1923
1923 establishments in Paraguay